Spatial turn is an intellectual movement that places emphasis on place and space in social science and the humanities. It is closely linked with quantitative studies of history, literature, cartography, and other studies of society. The movement has been influential in providing mass amounts of data for study of cultures, regions, and specific locations.

History 
Academics such as German philosopher Ernst Cassirer and American historian Lewis Mumford helped to define a sense of "community" and "commons" in their studies, forming the first part of a "spatial turn." The turn developed more comprehensively in the later 20th century in French academic theories, such as those of Michel Foucault. 

Technologies have also played an important role in "turns." The introduction of Geographic Information Systems (GIS) has also been instrumental in quantifying data in the humanities for study by its place.

References  

Humanities
Social sciences